Rodrigo Martins Gomes (born 7 July 2003) is a Portuguese professional footballer who plays as a forward for Primeira Liga club Braga.

Club career 
Born in Póvoa de Varzim and a product of S.C. Braga's youth system, Gomes made his debut in the Primeira Liga on 3 October 2020 in a 4–0 win at C.D. Tondela, as a substitute playing the final two minutes in place of Fransérgio. On 14 December, he made his first start in a 7–0 Taça de Portugal fourth round win at third-tier Clube Olímpico do Montijo, being taken off for Iuri Medeiros after 69 minutes.

On 19 July 2021, Gomes signed a new contract until 2026, increasing his buyout clause from €15 million to €35 million. After a season in the reserves in Liga 3, he scored his first top-flight goal on 21 August 2022, coming on as a late replacement to conclude a 5–0 win over C.S. Marítimo at the Estádio Municipal de Braga.

References

External links 
 
 

2003 births
Living people
People from Póvoa de Varzim
Sportspeople from Porto District
Portuguese footballers
Portugal youth international footballers
Association football forwards
S.C. Braga players
S.C. Braga B players
Primeira Liga players